Brynn Teakle (born 16 October 1999) is an Australian rules footballer who plays for Port Adelaide in the Australian Football League (AFL).

Early career

Teakle moved to East Fremantle from Northampton as a junior. He progressed from the colts to the seniors, making his senior debut in 2019. He spent a summer doing a preseason with  but wasn't drafted. He returned to East Fremantle where he continued to develop as a ruckman.

AFL Career

Teakle was the eighth player picked in the 2022 mid-season draft. He made his AFL debut in Round 14 of the 2022 AFL season against  at Adelaide Oval. Half way into he second quarter he broke his collarbone that required surgery.

References

External links

1999 births

Living people
Port Adelaide Football Club players
Port Adelaide Football Club players (all competitions)
Australian rules footballers from Western Australia
East Fremantle Football Club players